She Has No Strings Apollo is the sixth major album by Australian trio, Dirty Three. It reached No. 4 on the ARIA Hitseekers Albums chart. Cover art by guitarist Mick Turner.

Track listing

 "Alice Wading" – 8:23
 "She Has No Strings" – 8:40
 "Long Way To Go With No Punch" – 4:56
 "No Stranger Than That" – 7:11
 "Sister Let Them Try and Follow" – 5:17
 "She Lifted The Net" – 4:16
 "Rude (And Then Some Slight Return)" – 8:31

Bonus tracks

 "She Apollo" – 4:11
 "All Downhill From Here" – 6:28

References 

2003 albums
Dirty Three albums
Touch and Go Records albums